Xiyan Township is a township under the administration  of Lingbao City, in western Henan province, China, situated just north of G30 Lianyungang–Khorgas Expressway and  northwest of downtown Lingbao. , it has 39 villages under its administration.

References

Township-level divisions of Henan